Holland Road may refer to:

 Holland Road, London, United Kingdom
 Holland Road, Singapore, Singapore
 "Holland Road", a song by Mumford & Sons from their 2012 album Babel